

This is a list of the National Register of Historic Places listings in Buffalo, New York.

This is intended to be a complete list of the properties and districts on the National Register of Historic Places in Buffalo, New York, United States. The locations of National Register properties and districts for which the latitude and longitude coordinates are included below, may be seen in a map.

There are 256 properties and districts listed on the National Register in Erie County. The city of Buffalo is the location of 179 of these properties and districts; they are listed here, while the other properties and districts are listed separately. Another two properties in the city were formerly listed but have been removed.



Current listings

 

|}

Former listings

|}

See also

National Register of Historic Places listings in New York
List of National Historic Landmarks in New York
List of City of Buffalo landmarks and historic districts

References

Buffalo

Buffalo, New York-related lists